Silme Domingo was a Filipino American labor activist. With Gene Viernes, he was murdered in Seattle on June 1, 1981 while attempting to reform the Local 37 of the International Longshoremen's and Warehousemen's Union (ILWU).

Biography 
Silme Domingo was born in Killeen, Texas, on January 25, 1952 as one of the five children of Nemesio and Adelina Domingo. He grew up in Texas and his family moved to Seattle in 1960. Silme attended Ballard High School and graduated with honors from the University of Washington, where he was a student activist. He participated in the effort during the 1970s to save Seattle's International District, and in 1974 joined the Union of Democratic Filipinos (tagalog: Katipunan ng mga Demokratikong Pilipino, KDP) and established the Seattle KDP chapter, which organized the first protest in Seattle against the Ferdinand Marcos dictatorship. Domingo was co-founder of the Alaska Cannery Workers Association, a civil rights organization that pursued legal action against the discriminatory practices of Alaska canneries, in which Filipino American, Anglo American, and indigenous workers were paid, treated, and housed differently based on their race. Along with his fellow organizer and friend Gene Viernes, Domingo was elected as on officer in Seattle's Cannery Workers and Farm Laborers Union, Local 37 on an anti-corruption, union democracy platform.  He is survived by two children, Ligaya and Kalayaan.

Assassination 
Silme Domingo and Gene Viernes were officers and reformers in Local 37 of the International Longshoremen’s and Warehousemen’s Union (ILWU). They were elected on a reform platform as officers of ILWU Local 37 — to end corruption and bribery in the union. Domingo and Viernes were both shot on the afternoon of June 1, 1981 inside the Local 37 offices in Pioneer Square in downtown Seattle. Viernes died on the spot. Domingo, shot four times in the abdomen, managed to struggle to the street. The union hall was only a block from a fire station; two firefighters arrived within minutes, and Domingo managed to tell them the names of the killers, "Guloy and Ramil".

Taken to Harborview Medical Center, Domingo underwent multiple operations, but died the next day. Pompeyo Benito Guloy and Jimmy Bulosan Ramil, both members of Local 37 and of the Tulisan gang, were found guilty of first degree murder and sentenced to life in prison. During the investigation, the murders were further linked to Fortunato “Tony” Dictado, leader of the Tulisans.

The murders were originally thought to be an isolated act of violence, but friends and family organized a Committee for Justice for Domingo and Viernes (CJDV) eventually found links between the murders to Philippine President Ferdinand Marcos and his wife Imelda, who had ordered the murders in retaliation for the victims’ anti-Marcos organizing. In 1989,  and a federal jury agreed with the CJDV, finding Marcos guilty of the murders.

In 1991, former Local 37 president Constantine “Tony” Baruso (1928-2008) — a supporter of the Marcos regime — was also found guilty of aggravated first-degree murder in the death of Viernes but not Domingo.

Legacy 
In 2011, the Inlandboatmen's Union, Region 37, created an annual scholarship to honor the memory of Domingo and Viernes. The scholarship is available via the Harry Bridges Center for Labor Studies, University of Washington.

Silme Domingo and his fellow Local 37 labor activist Gene Viernes were among the 14 Marcos Martial Law era martyrs to be honored at the Bantayog ng mga Bayani memorial wall on November 30, 2011.

Since 1982, an annual event associated with the organization LELO - Legacy of Leadership, Equality and Organizing is held in Seattle to honor Silme Domingo and Gene Viernes and an award is presented to an organization or individual who exemplifies the values and principles of the two.

See also 
History of Filipino Americans
Wards Cove Packing Co. v. Atonio
Gene Viernes
Violeta Marasigan

References

Bibliography

External links 
 Selections from the University of Washington Digital Collections on Silme Domingo
 Selections from the Seattle Civil Rights and Labor History Project website Alaska Cannery Workers Association and Ward's Cove Case, 1973-1991 
 Selections from the Waterfront Workers History Project: Cannery Workers and Their Unions
Silme Domingo & Gene Viernes Scholarship in Labor Studies, Harry Bridges Center for Labor Studies, University of Washington
 One Generation`s Time: The Legacy of Silme Domingo and Gene Viernes a documentary on the Seattle Channel's Community Stories series.

Archival sources 
 Silme Domingo Papers, 1952-1992, 1 cubic feet (1 box)  at the Labor Archives of Washington, University of Washington Libraries Special Collections
 Chris Mensalvas and Silme Domingo Family Photograph Collection circa 1920s-circa 1981 22 photographic prints and 14 negatives, 2 contact sheets and 1 collage (1 box and 2 folders) at the Labor Archives of Washington, University of Washington Libraries Special Collections
 Cindy Domingo Papers 1973-2010, 43.9 cubic feet (44 boxes) at the Labor Archives of Washington, University of Washington Libraries Special Collections
 Cannery Workers and Farm Laborers Union Local 7 Records, 1915-1985 46.31 cubic feet at the Labor Archives of Washington, University of Washington Libraries Special Collections
 Cannery Workers and Farm Laborers Union, Local 7 Photographs 217 photographic prints, 6 contact sheets, 45 negatives, 1 postcard, 1 35mm color slide (1 box and 2 folders) at the Labor Archives of Washington, University of Washington Libraries Special Collections

1952 births
1981 deaths
American trade union leaders
Labor relations in the United States
Activists from Seattle
Marcos martial law victims
Individuals honored at the Bantayog ng mga Bayani
American people of Filipino descent
Filipino-Americans honored at the Bantayog ng mga Bayani